Events in the year 1651 in Norway.

Incumbents
Monarch: Frederick III

Events

29 July - Gregers Krabbe was appointed Governor-General of Norway.
1 December - The Vardø witch trials starts.

Arts and literature

Oppdal Church was built.

Births

Deaths
9 February - Herman Krefting, ironworks pioneer (born 1592).

See also

References